Parliamentary elections were held in Greece on 7 November 1926. The Liberal Union emerged as the largest faction in Parliament with 108 of the 286 seats. The composition of the new parliament meant that the parties and factions had to work together to form a viable parliamentary government. On Kafandaris' initiative, negotiations began among the main parties, leading to the swearing-in on the 4 December of a government under the premiership of Alexandros Zaimis who was not a member of parliament. The coalition consisted of the Liberal Union, the Democratic Union, the People's Party and the Freethinkers' Party. This government came to be known as the "Ecumenical government".

Results

References

Parliamentary elections in Greece
Greece
Legislative election
1920s in Greek politics
History of Greece (1924–1941)
Greece
Election and referendum articles with incomplete results